Archbishop John Barwa, S.V.D. is the serving Archbishop of the Roman Catholic Archdiocese of Cuttack-Bhubaneswar.

Early life and education 
Barwa was born in Gaibira, Odisha, India, on 1 June 1955. He holds a licentiate in Liturgy from the Pontifical Atheneum of St. Anselm.

Priesthood 
Barwa was ordained a Catholic priest of Society of the Divine Word on 14 April 1985.

Episcopate 
Rev. John Barwa was appointed Coadjutor Bishop of Rourkela on 4 Feb 2006 and ordained a Bishop on 19 April 2006 by Telesphore Toppo. He succeeded as a bishop of Roman Catholic Diocese of Rourkela started on 2 April 2009. He was appointed Archbishop of Roman Catholic Archdiocese of Cuttack-Bhubaneswar on 11 February 2011 by Pope Benedict XVI.

See also 
 List of Catholic bishops of India

References

External links 

Living people
21st-century Roman Catholic archbishops in India
1955 births
People from Sundergarh district
Pontifical Atheneum of St. Anselm alumni
Bishops appointed by Pope Benedict XVI
Divine Word Missionaries Order